Roberts Pike is a peak rising to 1,630 m, 5 nautical miles (9 km) southeast of Mount Tuatara in the Churchill Mountains. The culmination of several ridgelines, the summit commands a view of the drainage areas of Judith Glacier, Entrikin Glacier, and Couzens Bay. It was named by Advisory Committee on Antarctic Names (US-ACAN) after John "J.R." Roberts, a New Zealand mountaineer and field guide in 12 Antarctic seasons with United States Antarctic Program (USAP), 1987–88 to 2000–01, the last season in Churchill Mountains including work at this peak.

Mountains of Oates Land